The Page Turner is a 2006 French film directed by Denis Dercourt. It was screened in the Un Certain Regard section at the 2006 Cannes Film Festival.

Plot

A young girl, Mélanie Prouvost, aspires to be a pianist and auditions in front of famous pianist Ariane Fouchécourt for a place at a conservatoire. Ariane signs an autograph for an admirer during the recital, distracting Mélanie and affecting her performance. She leaves the audition with her mother, heartbroken.

Some years later Mélanie, having studied hard, finds a work experience placement at a solicitors. Perhaps coincidentally we find the husband of the famous pianist for whom she previously auditioned. The story develops as the young woman ingratiates herself into the life of the family, becoming a holiday carer for the young son who the family hopes will follow in the footsteps of the mother as a famous pianist. Befriending the boy, Melanie encourages him to prepare a full piano recital performance for the father's return to the family home after a business trip. She also manages to become indispensable to Ariane, both practically and emotionally. Melanie's perfectly timed page turning, combined with her composure and apparent empathy, enable Ariane to recover a confidence in performance that she thought she had lost after a traumatic car crash.

A very close and intimate relationship is established between the two women with Mélanie becoming obsessed with Ariane in order to get revenge for the humiliation that she suffered as a child. She manages to seduce Ariane and then abandons her but twists the emotional knife by revealing the relationship to Ariane's husband.

Cast
 Catherine Frot – Ariane Fouchécourt
 Déborah François – Mélanie Prouvost
 Pascal Greggory – Jean Fouchécourt
 Clotilde Mollet – Virginie
 Xavier De Guillebon – Laurent
 Christine Citti – Madame Prouvost
 Jacques Bonnaffé – Monsieur Prouvost
 Antoine Martynciow – Tristan Fouchécourt
 Julie Richalet – Young Mélanie Prouvost 
 Martine Chevallier – Jackie Onfray
 André Marcon – Werker
 Michèle Ernou – Monique

Reception
On Metacritic the film has a score of 67% based on reviews from 16 critics, indicating "generally favorable reviews".

References

External links
 

2006 films
2006 psychological thriller films
French psychological thriller films
2000s French-language films
Films about classical music and musicians
Films directed by Denis Dercourt
French films about revenge
2000s French films